This List of domestic workers are people who have worked as household servants or staff who have become notable, either for their domestic work career or for a subsequent career in another field, such as writing or art.

 Abdul Karim (the Munshi), servant of Queen Victoria of Great Britain
 Céleste Albaret, housekeeper of Marcel Proust
 Gladys Aylward, maid, afterwards missionary
 Alice Ayres, nursemaid honoured for her bravery in rescuing the children in her care from a house fire
 Sarah Balabagan
 Francis Barber with Samuel Johnson became residual heir.
 Fonzworth Bentley.
 Emily Blatchley, governess and missionary
 Sophie Brzeska, governess and writer
 Paul Burrell, butler to Diana, Princess of Wales
 Elizabeth Canning, maidservant in London
 Princess Caraboo (Mary Baker), English imposter
 Flor Contemplacion, executed for murder
 Elizabeth Cotten, musician, working for Charles Seeger the ethnomusicologist
 Hannah Cullwick, maid to A. J. Munby
 Lisette Denison Forth, maid and philanthropist
 Alonzo Fields, butler at the White House
 Caroline Herschel, astronomer (worked as a domestic servant in her father's household until his death)
 Paul Hogan, butler
 Bridget Holmes, chambermaid to kings of England
 Hélène Jégado, serial killer
 Dora Lee Jones, trade unionist
 Anna Leonowens, governess to the children of the King of Siam
 Thérèse Levasseur, laundress and chambermaid
 Margaret Maher, maid to Emily Dickinson
 Moa Martinson, author of proletarian literature, kitchen maid
 Ellen More (floruit circa 1500-1535), an African servant at the Scottish court
 Notburga, German saint, patron of hired hands
 Papin sisters, murderers
 Lillian Rogers Parks, housemaid and seamstress in the White House
 Rose Porteous, Lang Hancock's maid (afterwards his wife)
 Margaret Powell, maid and writer
 Isabel Grenfell Quallo, domestic worker and community activist
 Casimira Rodríguez, trade unionist and politician
 Margaret Rogers, maid at the White House
 Charles Spence, Scottish poet, stonemason and footman
 Deb Willet, maid in the household of Samuel Pepys
 Dorothy Bolden, domestic worker, community activist and President of the National Domestic Workers Union - Atlanta, Georgia

 
Domestic workers
Domestic workers